Caloreas leucobasis is a moth of the family Choreutidae. It is found in North America, including Oregon, Quebec, Ontario, Alberta and California.

In Canada, adults have been recorded from mid May to early July.

References

External links
mothphotographersgroup
Bug Guide

Choreutidae
Moths described in 1900